Ross Higgins (14 June 1931 – 7 October 2016) was an Australian vaudevillian, character actor, television host, comedian, singer and voice actor. He was best known for his role as Ted Bullpitt in the 1980s television situation comedy series Kingswood Country and brief revival Bullpitt!. He was also a commercial advertiser who provided the voice of animated character "Louie the Fly" in the television ad campaign for Mortein, over a 50-year period (the longest running such ad in Australia) as well as Mr. Pound, when decimal currency was first introduced in Australia.

Early career: radio and recording
Higgins' entertainment industry career began in 1946, when he took a cadetship at Sydney's 2GB commercial radio station at the age of 15. This led to an on-air announcing position and hosting of breakfast and, later, evening variety shows. A trained singer, he soon began recording singles which lifted his profile around Australia. His flair for comedy came to the fore in the 1950s when he became a cast member of the very popular The Jack Davey Show.  
He moved between commercial radio and the ABC, touring the country, hosting and singing with the ABC show band. It was during this period he performed with Peter Dawson, Slim Dusty and Mel Tormé. His radio career reached a peak in the mid-1950s and, when television arrived in 1956, he successfully made the transition, appearing on variety shows, hosting game shows on the 7 Network and in the early 1960s on Singalong and Bobby Limb's Sound of Music on the 9 Network.

Voice over
During the 1960s, Higgins consolidated his position as a leading voiceover artist, creating character voices for TV and radio ads and cartoons. His earliest character voice—"Louie the Fly" (an animated fly for the Mortein fly-spray commercials), was recorded by him as late as 2011. It is now the longest continuously running campaign in television history, having run for over 50 years (1957–2011). Other characters that Higgins voiced included Mr. Sheen, Mr. Pound and the Paddle Pop Lion.

Theatre
During the mid-1960s, Higgins worked in theatre, doing several back-to-back seasons at Sydney's Menzies Theatre Restaurant—a popular nightspot where musicals were staged under the direction of Hayes Gordon.

Television
Higgins played Rev. Larcombe in two episodes of the soap opera Motel in 1968. He also had guest roles in various series, including Division 4 and Skippy. Throughout the 1970s, he and voiceover colleague Kevin Golsby dominated Australian airwaves. While enjoying this success, another break-through role came in 1977 when he and Golsby were key regular performers in sketch comedy series The Naked Vicar Show. He played various characters in the series, which lasted two seasons. In 1980, a spin-off series based on a bombastic Holden Kingswood driving character he had portrayed in one sketch of The Naked Vicar Show was created. Titled Kingswood Country, the series had a successful five-year run, completing five-and-a-half seasons.

Higgins played a straight dramatic role in the soap opera Richmond Hill (1988). His character, a dour policeman, was the show's main authority figure. The series was cancelled at the end of 1988. In 1992, he starred in the Ten Network's sitcom Late for School (which launched the TV careers of Matthew Newton and Stephen Curry). Higgins' final series saw him reprise the Ted Bullpitt character in the situation comedy Bullpitt! in 1997, which had two seasons on the 7 Network. Kingswood Country has since found new audiences via cable TV, DVD and YouTube.

Recording
Higgins used his vocal talents on thousands of projects during his 60 years in radio and television, including recording the song "Monster Mash" for ABC For Kids Video Hits, and two albums of the classic Australian children's story "Blinky Bill".

Personal life and death
Higgins and his wife Nadine had four children.

Higgins died of unspecified causes on 7 October 2016, aged 85. He had been ill for some time and had been hospitalised for several weeks.

Discography

Albums

References

Australian male television actors
1931 births
2016 deaths
Male actors from Sydney
Australian male comedians
Australian male singers
Australian radio presenters
Australian male voice actors
Blinky Bill